Nannolytoceratidae is a taxonomic family of ammonoid cephalopods belonging to the suborder Lytoceratina.

References

 Ammonites
 Biolib
 GBIF
 Jsdammonites

Ammonitida families
Lytoceratina
Jurassic ammonites
Aalenian first appearances
Jurassic extinctions